= Uruguayan Film Commission =

The Uruguayan Film Commission is the national film commission of Uruguay, responsible for promoting locations in Uruguay for foreign productions and providing international exposure for national productions.
